Daniel M. Laskin (September 3, 1924 – December 8, 2021) was an American oral and maxillofacial surgeon and educator who contributed to his field for over fifty years. He excelled as an educator, a researcher and a clinician.  He served as AAOMS president, as well as the International Association of Oral and Maxillofacial Surgery, and served as the editor of the Journal of Oral and Maxillofacial Surgery till his death.  He was a major contributor to the dental literature with over 900 contributions to the field of Oral and Maxillofacial Surgery.  He co-authored 16 textbooks and monographs.

Early life and education
Laskin was born in New York City on September 3, 1924. He began his training at Indiana University, where he received a BS, he went on to attend Indiana University School of Dentistry. He then completed an Oral Surgery Internship at Jersey City Medical Center. He completed his residency training in Oral and Maxillofacial Surgery at the University of Illinois and Cook County Hospitals.

Career
Upon finishing residency, Laskin began his career as an OMS educator and practitioner at the University of Illinois College of Dentistry, where he worked for over 30 years. His mentor was Bernard Sarnat, an oral and plastic surgeon who made numerous contributions  as a pioneer in the field of craniofacial surgery. Laskin succeeded Sarnat as program director and went on to progress the specialty. At one time he was running the University of Illinois and Cook County Hospital Residency programs and had 22 residents. He then transferred to Medical College of Virginia at VCU in 1984 where he continued to work as an educator, researcher and clinician.

In 2007, Laskin established the Lectureship in Professional Ethics at Indiana University School of Dentistry.

"The Laskin Lectureship is the first if its kind to be established at Indiana University School of Dentistry," stated IUSD Dean Dr. Lawrence Goldblatt. He added, "Dr. Laskin, whose own career has exemplified professional ethics as well as promoted it, has made another landmark contribution to our school in providing the wherewithal to bring in the finest authorities on the subject every year for the benefit of our students, faculty, alumni and entire professional community. We at IUSD will be forever in his debt."

Laskin was well known to the Oral and Maxillofacial Surgery community even at the global level. He received honorary memberships to eight national oral and maxillofacial surgery societies. He received honorary doctoral degrees from England, Scotland, as well as his alma mater, Indiana University.

Later life
Laskin died on December 8, 2021, at the age of 97.

References

External links
AAOMS Today * July/August 2007  |  http://www.dentistry.vcu.edu/omfs/faculty/laskin.html

1924 births
2021 deaths
American surgeons
Indiana University alumni
University of Illinois Chicago faculty
Physicians from New York City